

List

Archie Bell & the Drells
Backstreet Boys
Bee Gees
Black Ivory
Bloodstone
Blue Magic
Boney M.
Boyz II Men
Brisbane Birralee Voices
Brownstone
Cliff Adams Singers
Crosby Stills & Nash
Danny & the Juniors
Dion & the Belmonts
Dixie Hummingbirds
Earth, Wind & Fire
En Vogue
Exposé
Frankie Lymon & the Teenagers
Gladys Knight & The Pips
Hank Ballard & The Midnighters
Home Free
Human Nature
James Brown & The Famous Flames
Jay & the Americans
Jodeci
Labelle
Ladysmith Black Mambazo
Little Anthony & the Imperials
Little Mix
New Birth
New Kids on the Block
New Edition
Nu Dimension
One Direction
Peter, Paul and Mary
Rare Silk
RichGirl
Martha Reeves & The Vandellas
SONO
The Ames Brothers
The Andrews Sisters
The Association
The Bangles
The Beach Boys
The Boswell Sisters
The Chordettes
The Chantels
The Charioteers
The Chi-Lites
The Chiffons
The Clovers
The Coasters
The Commodores
The Contours
The Crew-Cuts
The Dells
The Delfonics
The Delta Rhythm Boys
The Dramatics
The Dream Weavers
The Drifters
The Eagles
The Eagles (rhythm and blues group)
The Emotions
The Fifth Dimension
The Five Blind Boys of Mississippi
The Five Keys
The Five Satins
The Flamingos
The Floaters
The Foundations
The Four Aces
The Four Esquires
The Four Freshmen
The Four Knights
The Four Lads
The Four Seasons
The Four Tops
The Gaylords
The Golden Gate Quartet
The Harptones
The Hilltoppers
The Hi-Los
The Impressions
The Ink Spots
The Isley Brothers
The Jackson Five
The Jordanaires
The Kingston Trio
The Lennon Sisters
The Lettermen
The Main Ingredient
The Mamas & the Papas
The Manhattans
The Manhattan Transfer
Los Marcellos Ferial
The Marcels
The Marvelettes
The McGuire Sisters
The Merry Macs
The Midnighters
The Mills Brothers
The Miracles
The Modernaires
The Moonglows
The Oak Ridge Boys
The O'Jays
The Original Drifters
The Orioles
The Peerless Quartet
The Pied Pipers
The Platters
The Playmates
The Pointer Sisters
The Ravens
Reparata and the Delrons
The Revelers
The Roches
The Ronettes
Ruby & the Romantics
The Seekers
The Shirelles
The Skylarks
The Skyliners
The Soul Stirrers
The Spinners
The Springfields
The Statler Brothers
The Stylistics
The Supremes
The Swan Silvertones
The Temptations
The Tokens
Tavares
The Valentinos
The Vogues
The Wanted
The Weavers
The Whispers
Three Dog Night
Voz Veis
Westlife
78violet

References

See also
 Vocal Group Hall of Fame

Vocal groups
~List